The 2018 FC Akzhayik season is the club's 10th season in the Kazakhstan Premier League, the highest tier of association football in Kazakhstan, and their third since 2010. They will also participate in the Kazakhstan Cup.

Squad

Transfers

Winter

In:

Out:

Summer

In:

Out:

Competitions

Premier League

Results summary

Results by round

Results

League table

Kazakhstan Cup

Squad statistics

Appearances and goals

|-
|colspan="14"|Players away from Akzhayik on loan:
|-
|colspan="14"|Players who left Akzhayik during the season:

|}

Goal scorers

Disciplinary record

References

External links

FC Akzhayik seasons
Akzhayik